The 1998–99 Ukrainian Second League is the eighth season of 3rd level professional football in Ukraine. The competitions are divided into three groups – A, B, and C.

Group A

Promoted teams
 Enerhetyk Burshtyn - Winner of the Amateur League (debut)

Relegated teams
 Verkhovyna Uzhhorod - Placed 20th in the First League (returning, last time as Zakarpattia Uzhhorod in 1990 (Soviet Union))

Withdrawn teams
Before the season
 Berkut Bedevlya, Tysmenytsia, Karpaty Mukacheve refused to participate

During and after the season
 Krystal and Haray left the competition after the first half.

Renamed teams
 On November 7, 1998 Verkhovyna Uzhhorod had their name changed to Zakarpattia.

Location map

Standings 

Notes:
 Veres, Krystal, and Haray are fined of six tournament points. 
 The game Naftovyk - Systema-Boreks 2:1 was annulled and a technical loss (-:+) was awarded to the home team.

Group B

Team changes 
Kryvbas-2 Kryvyi Rih obtained the professional status and entered the Second League.

Slavutych-ChAES Slavutych, Fakel Varva refused to participate.

SKA-Lotto Odesa was replaced with Dynamo Odessa and renamed into Dynamo-SKA Odessa.

Location map

Standings 

Dynamo-SKA Odessa is fined of six tournament points. Lokomotyv and Nyva left the competition during the first half (Round 7). Fortuna and Dynamo-SKA stop their participation after the first half. The game Fortuna - Dynamo-SKA 3:3 was annulled and awarded a technical loss (-:+) to the home team for cheating.

Group C

Team changes 
Avanhard Rovenky, Zorya Luhansk, Khimik Severodonetsk participated previously in the First League. 

VPS Kramatorsk, Metalurh-2 Zaporizhzhia, Shakhtar Horlivka, Dalis Komyshuvakha obtained the professional status and entered the Second League.

Khimik Severodonetsk, Dalis Komyshuvakha, Metalurh-2 Donetsk, Slovianets Konotop, Pivdenstal Yenakieve refused to participate.

Location map

Standings

See also
 1998–99 Ukrainian Premier League
 1998–99 Ukrainian First League
 1998–99 Ukrainian Football Amateur League
 1999 Ukrainian Football Amateur League

External links
 1998–99 season. RSSSF
 1998–99 Ukrainian Second League . Footballfacts.ru
 1998–99 Ukrainian Second League (Group A). Ukr-football.org.ua.
 1998–99 Ukrainian Second League (Group A). Ukrainian football from Dmitriy Troschiy.

Ukrainian Second League seasons
3
Ukra